Andrés Javier Vasquez Rueda Pinto (born 16 July 1987) (often misspelled Vasques) is a Swedish former professional footballer who played as a midfielder.

Club career 
After playing for local clubs, he joined IFK Göteborg in 1997, the club he played for until January 2008.

He scored his first league goal for IFK Göteborg on May 7, 2007, against Örebro SK. The remarkable goal, a rabona kick from outside the penalty area, was by most experts seen as a candidate for the best goal of that year in Sweden.

In December 2007 Vasquez was signed by Swiss club FC Zürich on a 4-year-contract.

International career 
Andrés Vasquez rejected a call-up to the Peru national football team for a friendly with Costa Rica in March 2009 by coach José del Solar.

Career statistics

Club

Personal life 
He also has a younger brother, Salvador Vasquez, who plays football for JK Nõmme Kalju.

References

External links 
 

1987 births
Peruvian emigrants to Sweden
Living people
Swedish footballers
Sweden under-21 international footballers
Sweden youth international footballers
Association football midfielders
IFK Göteborg players
FC Zürich players
Grasshopper Club Zürich players
FC Wil players
BK Häcken players
Allsvenskan players
Swiss Super League players
Swiss Challenge League players
Swedish expatriate footballers
Expatriate footballers in Switzerland
Swedish expatriate sportspeople in Switzerland